Wellington—Huron was a federal electoral district represented in the House of Commons of Canada from 1953 to 1968. It was located in the province of Ontario. This riding was created in 1952 from parts of Huron North, Wellington North and Wellington South ridings.

Wellington—Huron consisted of the townships of Arthur, Garafraxa West, Maryborough, Minto, Nichol, Peel and West Luther, including the towns of Mount Forest and Palmerston in the county of Wellington, and the townships of Howick, Turnberry, and the town of Wingham the county of Huron.

The electoral district was abolished in 1966 when it was redistributed between Huron and Wellington—Grey ridings.

Members of Parliament

This riding elected the following members of the House of Commons of Canada:

Election results

|- 
  
|Progressive Conservative
|Marvin Howe
|align="right"|7,198 
  
|Liberal
|Arnold Darroch 
|align="right"| 7,120    
|}

|- 
  
|Progressive Conservative
|Marvin Howe
|align="right"| 9,421 
  
|Liberal
|Arnold Darroch 
|align="right"|5,741   
|}

|- 
  
|Progressive Conservative
|Marvin Howe
|align="right"|10,574 
  
|Liberal
|Ross McLellan
|align="right"| 4,963  
|}

|- 
  
|Progressive Conservative
|Marvin Howe
|align="right"| 7,455 
  
|Liberal
|Fred G. Beck 
|align="right"| 5,344 
 
|New Democratic
|H. Gordon Green
|align="right"| 2,616    
|}

|- 
  
|Progressive Conservative
|Marvin Howe
|align="right"| 8,391 
  
|Liberal
|Bill Tilden
|align="right"|  5,809 
 
|New Democratic
|Oliver Mabee 
|align="right"| 1,152  
|}

|- 
  
|Progressive Conservative
|Marvin Howe
|align="right"| 7,792
  
|Liberal
|H. Gordon Green
|align="right"| 5,385 
 
|New Democratic
|John R. MacLeod 
|align="right"| 1,304   
|}

See also 

 List of Canadian federal electoral districts
 Past Canadian electoral districts

External links 

 Website of the Parliament of Canada

Former federal electoral districts of Ontario